Rebel Randall (born Alaine Charlotte Dorothy Brandes, January 22, 1922 – July 22, 2010), was an American film actress and radio personality. She appeared in approximately 50 films between 1940 and 1956.

She was a popular G.I. pin-up girl during the 1940s and did several layouts, including one for Esquire magazine. She did a stint as "The Coca-Cola Girl" in advertisements and was a disc jockey for the Armed Forces Radio Services and hosted a show called "Radio Calling". In the 1950s, Rebel discovered that a New Orleans stripper began using her name and she had to legally stop her.

According to an interview with Mike Barnum in the December 2009 issue of "Classic Images", she got her initial start after winning a scholarship to the Max Reinhardt Workshop in Hollywood where she appeared as Queen Titania in a version of "A Midsummer Night's Dream. Once a John Robert Powers model before going to Hollywood. Born and raised in Chicago, and graduated from Foreman High School.

A glamorous brunette, she is remembered for her several dozen cinematic appearances from the early 1940s thru the mid 1950s. After making a name for herself doing radio commercials, she moved to Hollywood where she made her 1940 silver screen bow in "Turnabout". Working as a Paramount contract player, she was seen in numerous features of the day, among them 1941's "The Lone Rider in Ghost Town", "In Old Oklahoma" and "The Powers Girl" (both 1943), the 1945 "Booby Dupes", and 1945's "The Shadow Returns".

During World War II, Rebel also worked as a Powers model, was a popular GI pin-up girl, was featured as "Esquire" magazine's centerfold at least twice, and had two failed marriages to radio personality William Mann Moore, A.K.A. Peter Potter; in 1949, she was named "The Most Beautiful Girl on TV".

In September 1953, Rebel married wealthy actor and businessman Glenn Thompson in an ill-starred union that lasted only a few days due to her husband's apparent mental instability, the marriage ending in annulment.

Last seen on the screen in the 1956 short "Come on Seven", she lived the rest of her days in Southern California, was for a time the face of Coca-Cola, had romances with several high-profile men, though she never married again, gradually faded from view, and died after spending her final years in a nursing facility. A number of her films are preserved on DVD.

Favorite Quotes
 "I loved my work and I took it seriously."
 "One of the problems of being an actor is that you work, and then you don't work. The time that you don't work might be extensive and you do still have to continue to live."

Selected filmography
 Hold That Woman (1940)
 Turnabout (1940)
 The Boys From Syracuse (1940)
 Louisiana Purchase [as Alaine Brandes] (1941)
 The Lone Rider in Ghost Town (1941)
 The Fired Man [as Alaine Brandes] (1941)
 Ziegfeld Girl (film) (1941)
 Pacific Blackout (1941)
 Arabian Nights (1942 film) (1942)
 Fall In (1942)
 Sin Town (1942)
 Holiday Inn (film) (1942)
 About Face (1942)
 The Fleet's In (1942)
 In Old Oklahoma (1943)
 Hi'ya Sailor (1943)
 Happy Go Lucky (1943)
 The Powers Girl (1943)
 Fired Wife (1943)
 Gals, Incorporated (1943)
 Hit the Ice (film) (1943)
 Good Morning, Judge (1943)
 Hi Buddy (1943)
 It Comes Up Love (1943)
 The Suspect (1944)
 She Snoops to Conquer (1944)
 Dead or Alive (1944)
 Atlantic City (1944)
 Seven Doors to Death (1944)
 Booby Dupes (1945)
 Adventure (1945)
 A Thousand and One Nights (1945)
 Where the Pest Begins (1945)
 Here Come the Co-Eds (1945)
 Because of Him (1946)
 Society Mugs (1946)
 Hot Water (1946)
 The Shadow Returns (1946)
 Night and Day (1946)
 The Stranger (1946)
 Her Kind of Man (1946)
 The Shadow Returns (1946)
 That's My Gal (1947)
 The Homestretch (1947)
 The Bride Goes Wild (1948)
 Roaring City (1951)
 Fun on the Run (1951)
 Come on Seven (1956)

References

External links

1922 births
2010 deaths
Burials at Desert Memorial Park
American film actresses
21st-century American women